The 1962 Singapore Open, also known as the 1962 Singapore Open Badminton Championships, took place from 14 – 16 December 1962 at the Singapore Badminton Hall in Singapore.

Venue
Singapore Badminton Hall

Final results

References 

Singapore Open (badminton)
1962 in badminton